The 2020 Belarusian Premier League was the 30th season of top-tier football in Belarus. Dynamo Brest were the defending champions, having won their first league title last year. Shakhtyor Soligorsk became champions on the last play date by beating FC Minsk 4–2. Meanwhile, BATE Borisov didn't win and drew 0–0 at Dinamo Minsk so Shaktyor Soligorsk finished 1 point above BATE in the table and will play in the 2021–22 UEFA Champions League.

By late March 2020, it was the only European top-flight league being contested, as all others were suspended due to the COVID-19 pandemic; games were played with crowds. As a result, this led to substantially increased viewership from all over the world, due to sporting inactivity elsewhere.

Teams

The 15th-placed team of the last season Gomel was relegated to the 2020 Belarusian First League. Torpedo Minsk were excluded from the league halfway through the last season and will not play in any league in 2020. Gomel and Torpedo were replaced by two best teams of 2019 Belarusian First League (Belshina Bobruisk and Smolevichi).

14-placed team of the last season (Dnyapro Mogilev) were relegated after they lost relegation/promotion playoffs against First League third-placed team Rukh Brest (who were promoted to replace Dnyapro).

Personnel

Managerial changes

League table

Results
Each team plays home-and-away once against every other team for a total of 30 matches played each.

Relegation play-offs 
The 14th-place finisher of this season (Slutsk) were played a two-legged relegation play-off against the third-placed team of the 2020 Belarusian First League (Krumkachy Minsk) for a spot in the 2021 Premier League.

Leg 1

Leg 2

Season statistics

Top goalscorers
Updated to games played on 1 November 2020 Source: football.by

Hat-tricks

Disciplinary

Most yellow cards: (10)
  Syarhey Kislyak (Dynamo Brest)

Most red cards: (2)
  Hayk Mosakhanian (Energetik-BGU)
  Gaby Kiki (Dynamo Brest)
  Marat Burayev (Slutsk)
  Aleksandr Svirepa (Energetik-BGU)
  Yevgeniy Yudchits (Energetik-BGU)
  Yury Kazlow (Slutsk)

Awards

Weekly awards

Player of the Week

Goal of the Week

Monthly awards

Manager of the Month

Goal of the Month

Player of the Month

References

External links
 

2020
Belarus
Belarus
1